English actress Charlotte Rampling began her acting career in 1965. She has appeared in more than 110 films. Her film roles include Georgy Girl (1966), The Damned (1969), Henry VIII and His Six Wives (1972), The Night Porter (1974), Farewell, My Lovely (1975), Stardust Memories (1980), The Verdict (1982), Angel Heart (1987),  DOAThe Duchess (2008), 45 Years (2015), and Hannah (2017). She has also made television appearances, which include Dexter, Restless, Broadchurch and London Spy.

Film

Television

Video games

See also 
List of awards and nominations received by Charlotte Rampling

References

External links 
 

Actress filmographies
British filmographies